{{DISPLAYTITLE:C19H23NO5}}
The molecular formula C19H23NO5 (molar mass: 345.39 g/mol) may refer to:
 Semorphone
 Tretoquinol, a beta-adrenergic agonist
 WB-4101, an antagonist at the α1B-adrenergic receptor.